Middletown Park is an unincorporated community in Center Township, Delaware County, Indiana.

Geography

References

Unincorporated communities in Delaware County, Indiana
Unincorporated communities in Indiana